Germany–Syria relations are the bilateral relations between Germany and Syria. Germany shuttered its Damascus embassy in 2012 because of the Syrian civil war but never completely cut relations with the Syrian government.

History 
In 1927, the German Empire established a consulate to represent its interests in Lebanon and Syria. In 1934 the consulate was transformed into a consulate general. During Second World War, Syria was briefly under control of the German-dependent Vichy regime, but was captured by British and anti-German French forces in 1941 in the Syria–Lebanon campaign. After the war, Syria declared independence on April 17, 1946. Former officers of the Wehrmacht were involved as advisors in building up the Syrian armed forces. In 1952, diplomatic relations were established between Syria and the Federal Republic of Germany (FRG) were established. At the time of the United Arab Republic (1958-1961), Syria operated a joint embassy in Bonn with Egypt under Nasser.

After the FRG's diplomatic recognition of Israel in 1965, Syria severed diplomatic relations with the FRG. Instead, informal relations with the German Democratic Republic (GDR) were expanded, and by the mid-1960s the two countries had become close partners even before official diplomatic relations were established in 1969. The GDR provided extensive economic aid to Syria, which was ruled by the Baath Party. For example, GDR advisors helped establish a centrally-planned economy in Syria, and Syrian security forces were trained by the Ministry of State Security and their Syrian equivalents were modeled on the GDR, influencing the Syrian state into the 21st century. With the coming to power of the less socialist oriented Syrian nationalist Hafiz al-Assad in 1970, relations with the GDR were eventually scaled back, and relations with the FRG were resumed in 1974.

In 2001, Syrian President Bashar al-Assad visited German Chancellor Gerhard Schröder on a state visit in Berlin. The meeting was about a peace plan for the Middle East conflict and German development aid. German Development Minister Heidemarie Wieczorek-Zeul proclaimed the motto "change through cooperation". After German Reunification, Syria moved its embassy from Bonn to Berlin in 2002/03. With the start of the Civil War in Syria, the German embassy in Damascus was closed in 2012. Germany joined economic sanctions against the Assad regime and cut diplomatic contacts with the Syrian government to a minimum. In addition, several Syrian diplomats were expelled from the country, including the Syrian ambassador to Germany in May 2012 after the Massacre of Hula. Unlike other Western countries such as the United States, however, diplomatic relations were not severed. In the context of the crisis in Syria, Germany provided billions of dollars in humanitarian assistance and took in large numbers of Syrian refugees itself.

On December 4, 2015, the Bundestag voted to authorize the participation of the Bundeswehr in the international anti-ISIL coalition in Syria, which ended in January 2021. The Berlin Prosecutor General's Office opened an investigation at the end of January 2017 into allegations that the Syrian embassy in Berlin had issued passports without verification but with an extra fee. In February 2021, a Syrian was sentenced by a Regional Court to four and a half years in prison for crimes committed in the Syrian civil war, marking the first international conviction for a war crime committed in this civil war.

Migration 

Major migration between the countries first occurred in the 1960s as part of the close partnership between East Germany and Syria. A total of 4000 Syrian students studied in West and East Germany, and in 2009, 22 percent of professors at the University of Damascus had a German degree. In 2009, there were about 30,000 Syrians living in Germany. More than six million Syrians have left their homes as part of the civil war in the country. In 2021, there were approximately 868,000 people from Syria living in Germany, the vast majority of whom arrived in the country as part of the Refugee Crisis 2015/2016. Well-known German-Syrians include political scientist Bassam Tibi, politician Lamya Kaddor and football player Mahmoud Dahoud.

Economic relations 
Syria's economic performance plummeted with the start of the civil war in 2011, and the country was placed under sanctions by Western industrialized countries. Economic relations with Germany are therefore weak. The bilateral trade volume amounted to only 60 million euros in 2021.

Before the civil war, Syria was a major tourist destination due to its cultural sites and was also visited by many Germans. Since 2019, some tourists from Germany have been traveling to the country again, despite travel warnings.

Humanitarian aid 
Since the beginning of the Syrian civil war, Germany has provided humanitarian aid amounting to more than 10 billion euros up to 2022, making it one of the leading donor countries. The German government has worked with partners such as the United Nations World Food Programme, the Red Cross, and Save the Children. The focus has been on supporting refugees in Syria and neighboring countries. Aid was also provided to stabilize regions in northern Syria that had been occupied by the Islamic State.

Diplomatic locations 

 Germany has an Embassy in Damascus (closed since 2012).
 Syria has an Embassy in Berlin.

See also

Foreign relations of Germany
Foreign relations of Syria

Further reading

References 

Foreign relations of Germany
Foreign relations of Syria
Germany–Syria relations